KRZS (99.1 FM, "The Hawg") is a radio station broadcasting a classic rock music format. Licensed to Pangburn, Arkansas, United States, the station is currently owned by Crain Media Group, LLC.

History
On December 25, 2015, KRZS changed their format from classic country (branded as "99.1 The Stallion") to classic rock, branded as "99.1 The Hawg".

Previous logo

References

External links

RZS
Country radio stations in the United States